Cyanothamnus ramosus is a species of plant in the citrus family Rutaceae and is endemic to the southwest of Western Australia. It is an erect, mostly glabrous shrub with pinnate leaves with up to seven leaflets, and white, four-petalled flowers with blue or pale green backs.

Description
Flowering occurs from May to October.

Taxonomy and naming
This species was first formally described in 1839 by John Lindley who gave it the name Cyanothamnus ramosus and published the description in A Sketch of the Vegetation of the Swan River Colony. In 1863, George Bentham changed the name to Boronia ramosa. In a 2013 paper in the journal Taxon, Marco Duretto and others restored Lindley's name Cyanothamnus ramosus on the basis of cladistic analysis. The specific epithet (ramosus) is a Latin word meaning "full of branches".

In 1971 and 1998, Paul Wilson described three subspecies in the journal Nuytsia. The names have subsequently been changed to reflect the change in the genus name:
 Cyanothamnus ramosus subsp. anethifolius (Bartl.)
 Cyanothamnus ramosus (Lindl.)

Distribution and habitat
Cyanothamnus ramosus grows on slopes and hillsides, sometimes in disused gravel pits and is widespread in the southwest from near Shark Bay to near Esperance. Subspecies anethifolius occurs between the Murchison River, the Stirling Range and Cape Le Grand, subspecies lesueuranus is only known from near Mt Lesueur and subspecies ramosus mainly from the Darling Range.

Conservation status
Cyanothamnus ramosus is classed as "not threatened" by the Western Australian Government Department of Parks and Wildlife, but subspecies lesueuranus is listed as "Priority Two" by the Western Australian Government Department of Biodiversity, Conservation and Attractions, meaning that it is poorly known and from only one or a few locations.

References 

ramosus
Flora of Western Australia
Plants described in 1839
Taxa named by John Lindley